The 2018 AFC U-23 Championship qualification was an international men's under-23 football competition which decided the participating teams of the 2018 AFC U-23 Championship.

A total of 16 teams qualified to play in the final tournament, including China PR who qualified automatically as hosts.

Draw
Of the 47 AFC member associations, a total of 40 teams entered the competition. The final tournament hosts China PR decided to participate in qualification despite having automatically qualified for the final tournament.

The draw was held on 17 March 2017, 15:00 MYT (UTC+8), at the AFC House in Kuala Lumpur, Malaysia. The 40 teams were drawn into ten groups of four teams. For the draw, teams were divided into two zones:
West Zone: 20 teams from West Asia, Central Asia and South Asia, to be drawn into five groups of four teams (Groups A–E).
East Zone: 20 teams from ASEAN and East Asia, to be drawn into five groups of four teams (Groups F–J).

The teams were seeded according to their performance in the 2016 AFC U-23 Championship final tournament and qualification. The following restrictions were also applied:
The nine teams which indicated their intention to serve as qualification group hosts prior to the draw were drawn into separate groups.
As Iran and Saudi Arabia refused to travel to each other's country, they would not be drawn into the same group.
As Iran, Syria and Lebanon had indicated they would not travel to Palestine, they would not be drawn into the group hosted by Palestine.

Notes
Teams in bold qualified for the final tournament.
(H): Qualification group hosts (* Cambodia chosen as qualification group hosts after the draw)
(Q): Final tournament hosts, automatically qualified regardless of qualification results
(W): Withdrew after draw

Player eligibility
Players born on or after 1 January 1995 were eligible to compete in the tournament.

Format
In each group, teams played each other once at a centralised venue. The ten group winners and the five best runners-up qualified for the final tournament. If the final tournament hosts China PR won their group or were among the five best runners-up, the sixth best runner-up also qualified for the final tournament.

Tiebreakers
Teams were ranked according to points (3 points for a win, 1 point for a draw, 0 points for a loss), and if tied on points, the following tiebreaking criteria were applied, in the order given, to determine the rankings (Regulations Article 9.3):
Points in head-to-head matches among tied teams;
Goal difference in head-to-head matches among tied teams;
Goals scored in head-to-head matches among tied teams;
If more than two teams are tied, and after applying all head-to-head criteria above, a subset of teams are still tied, all head-to-head criteria above are reapplied exclusively to this subset of teams;
Goal difference in all group matches;
Goals scored in all group matches;
Penalty shoot-out if only two teams are tied and they met in the last round of the group;
Disciplinary points (yellow card = 1 point, red card as a result of two yellow cards = 3 points, direct red card = 3 points, yellow card followed by direct red card = 4 points);
Drawing of lots.

Groups
The matches were played between 15 and 23 July 2017.

Group A
All matches were held in Kyrgyzstan.
Times listed were UTC+6.

Group B
All matches were held in Saudi Arabia.
Times listed were UTC+3.

Group C
All matches were held in Qatar.
Times listed were UTC+3.

Group D
All matches were held in United Arab Emirates.
Times listed were UTC+4.

Group E
All matches were held in Palestine.
Times listed were UTC+3.

Group F
All matches were held in Myanmar.
Times listed were UTC+6:30.

Group G
All matches were held in North Korea.
Times listed were UTC+8:30.

Group H
All matches were held in Thailand.
Times listed were UTC+7.

Group I
All matches were held in Vietnam.
Times listed were UTC+7.

Group J
All matches were held in Cambodia.
Times listed were UTC+7.

Ranking of second-placed teams
Due to groups having different number of teams after the withdrawal of Sri Lanka from Group A, the results against the fourth-placed teams in four-team groups were not considered for this ranking.

Qualified teams
The following 16 teams qualified for the 2018 AFC U-23 Championship.

1 Bold indicates champions for that year. Italic indicates hosts for that year.

Goalscorers

Notes

References

External links
, the-AFC.com
AFC U-23 Championship 2018, stats.the-AFC.com

Qualification
2018
U-23 Championship qualification
2017 in youth association football
July 2017 sports events in Asia